Zion Episcopal Church is a historic Episcopal church complex located near Washington, Beaufort County, North Carolina. It was built in 1856, and is a vernacular Greek Revival style frame building.  Also on the property are a contributing church cemetery, rectory (1884-1885), garage, well house, and fence.

It was listed on the National Register of Historic Places in 2000.

References

Episcopal church buildings in North Carolina
Churches on the National Register of Historic Places in North Carolina
Churches completed in 1856
Churches in Beaufort County, North Carolina
National Register of Historic Places in Beaufort County, North Carolina
19th-century Episcopal church buildings